Patsy's is a family-owned and operated Neapolitan cuisine restaurant at 236 West 56th Street (between Broadway and Eighth Avenue) in Midtown Manhattan, New York City.

History
It was founded by Pasquale "Patsy" Scognamillo in 1944.  In over 70 years of existence, Patsy's has had only three chefs: the late Patsy himself, his son Joe Scognamillo (who has been at the establishment since the age of seven) and Joe's son Sal Scognamillo (who has been manning the kitchen for the past 25 years).

Reviews
In 2013, Zagats gave it a food rating of 23, and ranked it # 9 .

Celebrity appeal
Patsy's has been known for years as Frank Sinatra's favorite restaurant and, in fact, his family still eats at Patsy's whenever they are in town. In addition to Sinatra and family, Patsy's Italian Restaurant has become a favorite with countless stars on both the east and west coast, who have come to regard Patsy's as a mecca of Italian fine dining.

Some of Patsy's Italian Restaurant high-profile patrons include Rush Limbaugh, Al Pacino, Keith Peterson, Frankie Valli, Plácido Domingo, Alec Baldwin, Kim Basinger, Tom Hanks, Madonna, George Clooney, rappers Heavy D and Puff Daddy, David Letterman, Oprah Winfrey, Keanu Reeves, Jonathan Demme, Tony Bennett, Don King, Robert De Niro, Don Rickles, Jaclyn Smith, Phyllis George, Stephen King, Mario Puzo, Calvin Klein, Carroll O'Connor, Jon Bon Jovi, Liza Minnelli, John F. Kennedy, Jr., Chris Noth, Farrah Fawcett, Jamie Farr, Chevy Chase, Cheryl Ladd, Huey Lewis, Pablo Picasso, Patti LaBelle. and Tom Torpey

Expansion
For years Patsy's had only one restaurant, which was its 236 West 56th Street location. In 2008, a second Patsy's was opened in the Hilton in Atlantic City, unveiling the first of the Patsy's franchise restaurants. There are subtle differences in decor and menu offerings between the two restaurants, but critics and customers have responded favorably to Patsy's in Atlantic City, claiming that it offers the same atmosphere and food of the original.

See also
 List of Italian restaurants

References

External links

Taste of T, New York Times
Back of The House

Italian-American culture in New York City
Italian restaurants in New York City
Neapolitan cuisine
Restaurants in Manhattan
Restaurants established in 1944
Midtown Manhattan
Family-owned companies of the United States